Sucker Lake is located by Coffins Mills, New York. The outlet creek flows into the Little River. Fish species present in the lake are white sucker, smallmouth bass, largemouth bass, rock bass, and black bullhead. There is a state owned beach launch off Briggs Switch Road. No gas motors allowed on this lake.

References

Lakes of New York (state)
Lakes of St. Lawrence County, New York